Gazdan (also Romanized as Gazdān; also known as Gardūn) is a village in Pataveh Rural District, Pataveh District, Dana County, Kohgiluyeh and Boyer-Ahmad Province, Iran. At the 2006 census, its population was 236, in 50 families.

References 

Populated places in Dana County